Vrdoljak is a South Slavic family name commonly found in Croatia and may refer to:

 Antun Vrdoljak (b. 1931), Croatian film director and actor
 Dražen Vrdoljak (1951–2008), Croatian music critic and journalist
 Ivan Vrdoljak (b. 1972), Croatian politician and current Economy Minister
 Ivana Vrdoljak (b. 1970), née Ranilović, also known by her stage name Vanna, Croatian pop singer, daughter-in-law of Antun Vrdoljak
 Ivica Vrdoljak (b. 1983), Croatian football player
 Nicholas Vrdoljak (b. 1996), Croatian figure skater
 Vjekoslav Vrdoljak (b. 1954), Croatian cinematographer, son of Antun Vrdoljak
 Zdeslav Vrdoljak (b. 1971), Croatian water polo player

Croatian surnames